Walter Toppo (born 1 October 1994) is an Indian cricketer. He made his Twenty20 debut on 16 January 2021, for Odisha in the 2020–21 Syed Mushtaq Ali Trophy.

References

External links
 

1994 births
Living people
Indian cricketers
Odisha cricketers
People from Sundergarh district
Cricketers from Odisha